Cormot-le-Grand is a former commune in the Côte-d'Or department in eastern France. On 1 January 2017, it was merged into the new commune Cormot-Vauchignon.

Population

See also
Communes of the Côte-d'Or department

References

Former communes of Côte-d'Or
Populated places disestablished in 2017